Frances Conant may refer to:
 Frances Ann Conant, American spiritualist medium
 Frances Augusta Hemingway Conant, American journalist, editor, and businesswoman

See also
 Francis Pigott Stainsby Conant, British politician